Liévin De Winne (Ghent, 24 January 1821 - Brussels, 13 May 1880) was a Belgian portrait painter who painted the official portrait of Leopold I on which the first postage stamp of Belgium was based.

De Winne was a pupil of Félix De Vigne and Henri van der Haert at the Royal Academy of Fine Arts in Ghent. In 1850 he received a grant from the government of Belgium that enabled him to travel to Paris and from 1852 to 1855 he was able to share a studio with Jules Breton who subsequently wrote De Winne's biography. From 1861, De Winne resumed residency in Belgium where he established himself as a portrait painter to high society. His direct and insightful style won him many eminent clients and was a decisive break with the more romantic style of earlier Belgian portrait painting.

Selected works
Separation of Ruth and Naomi, 1853.
St. Francis in Ecstasy, 1854.
The holy women at the tomb of Christ, 1858.
Emile Breton in uniform of captain of the guard furniture of the Pas-de-Calais, Palace of Fine Arts, Lille.
Count and Countess of Flanders.
Leopold I, 1860, Royal Museums of Fine Arts of Belgium, Brussels.
P. Verhaegen, 1863.
L. Roelandt, 1864.
The American diplomat J.S. Sanford, 1878. Presented at the Universal Exposition in Paris.

References

External links

 :fr:Lievin De Winne
 :de:Lievin de Winne
 :it:Liévin De Winne

1821 births
1880 deaths
Royal Academy of Fine Arts (Ghent) alumni
19th-century Belgian painters
19th-century Belgian male artists